Anwar Ibrahim, the 10th prime minister of Malaysia, has made 6 international trips to 6 nations during his premiership, which began on 24 November 2022.

Summary 
The number of visits per nation where Prime Minister Anwar travelled are:

 One: Indonesia, Brunei, Singapore, Thailand, Turkey, Philippines

2023

Future trips 
The following international trips are scheduled to be made by Anwar :

Multilateral meetings

See also 

 Foreign relations of Malaysia
 List of international prime ministerial trips made by Ismail Sabri Yaakob
 List of international prime ministerial trips made by Muhyiddin Yassin

References 

2022 in international relations
Foreign relations of Malaysia
Anwar Ibrahim
Lists of diplomatic trips
Diplomatic visits by heads of government
21st century in international relations
Anwar Ibrahim